One Night's Intoxication is a 1951 West German romantic drama film directed by Eduard von Borsody and starring Christl Mardayn, Richard Häussler and Paul Dahlke. In Austria it was known by the title Alexa.

It was shot at the Bavaria Studios in Munich. The film's sets were designed by the art director Ernst H. Albrecht.

Cast
 Christl Mardayn as Frau Siebel gen. Alexa
 Richard Häussler as Axel Peterson
 Paul Dahlke as Generaldirektor Siebel
 Gertrud Kückelmann as Inge Siebel, Musikstudentin
 Ulrich Beiger as Dr. Felix Fichtner
 Elise Aulinger as Johanna, Hausangestellte bei Siebel
 Fritz Reiff as Generaldirektor Wittemann
 Georg Vogelsang as Schäfer, Nachtportier
 Paul Henckels as Fritz, Oberkellner
 Herta Worell as Petra, Bardame
 Mady Rahl as Charlott, Bardame
 Margarete Slezak as Madame Yvonne

References

Bibliography

External links 
 

1951 films
German romantic drama films
1951 romantic drama films
West German films
1950s German-language films
Films directed by Eduard von Borsody
Films shot at Bavaria Studios
German black-and-white films
1950s German films